Elections to Tower Hamlets London Borough Council were held on 2 May 2002.  The whole council was up for election with boundary changes since the last election in 1998 increasing the number of seats by 1. The Labour party kept overall control of the council.

Election result

Ward results

References
2002 Tower Hamlets election result
Ward results

2002
2002 London Borough council elections
21st century in the London Borough of Tower Hamlets